Käthe Menzel-Jordan (née Hertel; born 7 September 1916) is a German architect and preservationist. , she is the oldest member of the Thuringian Chamber of Architects and lives in Erfurt.

Life and work
Käthe Menzel-Jordan was born on 7 September 1916 in Erfurt. Her grandfather Reinhold Schreiber owned a construction business on Michaelisstrasse in Erfurt and was a very busy building contractor in the last quarter of the 19th century. Menzel-Jordan therefore decided to work professionally in the construction industry.

During the 1930s, she studied architecture and art history in Dresden. The young architect was surprised by the outbreak of World War II; she decided to take advantage of another training opportunity and dealt with business administration and technical administration. She survived the air raids on Dresden by chance, as she was on home leave during this time. When she returned, her Dresden apartment with all her belongings and the dissertation that had already started had been destroyed.

After her return, Menzel-Jordan willingly took on many emergency security assignments and projects to alleviate the housing shortage in the city that was destroyed by air raids on Weimar. She was able to finish her training with the Thuringian state government. The young and politically unaffected architect stayed in Thuringia. She received orders from the Soviet headquarters in Weimar to secure the devastated Goethe House and to put it back in order. Many similar projects followed until the founding of East Germany.

Menzel-Jordan decided to expand her professional knowledge by studying at the Dresden University of Technology. Her dissertation, submitted in 1955, dealt with the approximately 50 watermills that have existed in Erfurt since the Middle Ages.

As a freelance architect in the Ulbricht era, Menzel-Jordan initially only found offers that did not challenge her creative skills and knowledge, she finally found a rich field of activity in cooperation with the church building authorities in Erfurt and later also the respective building departments in the city administration. Her most important projects in Erfurt include the St. Augustine's Monastery, which had been destroyed by British mine bombs in the course of the air raids on Erfurt, Krämerbrücke, Michaelisstraße, Domplatz, Predigerkirche, Michaeliskirche, and Molsdorf Castle.

At the age of 80, Menzel-Jordan ventured into her last project, the general renovation of the family-owned house at Michaelisstrasse 19/20 in Erfurt's old town. During the development work, archaeological investigations revealed the house was the oldest documented residential building in Erfurt's old town and was built in the late 13th century.

On 10 September 2016, Menzel-Jordan celebrated a service for her 100th birthday in the Erfurt Michaeliskirche together with many companions and guests at the invitation of the Erfurt Church District of the Evangelical Church of Central Germany.

References

1916 births
Living people
People from Erfurt
20th-century German architects
21st-century German architects
East German architects
East German women
German women architects
German centenarians
Women centenarians